Gynnidomorpha romonana is a species of moth of the  family Tortricidae. It is found in North America, where it has been recorded from Indiana, Manitoba, Maryland, New Jersey and Ontario.

The wingspan is 10–12 mm. Adults have been recorded on wing in May, July and September.

References

Moths described in 1908
Cochylini